Park Hye-jin (born 22 July 1990) is a South Korean basketball player for Asan Woori Bank Wibee and the South Korean national team.

She participated at the 2018 FIBA Women's Basketball World Cup.

References

External links

1990 births
Living people
Guards (basketball)
South Korean women's basketball players
Sportspeople from Busan
Asian Games medalists in basketball
Asian Games gold medalists for South Korea
Asian Games silver medalists for Korea
Basketball players at the 2014 Asian Games
Basketball players at the 2018 Asian Games
Medalists at the 2014 Asian Games
Medalists at the 2018 Asian Games
Basketball players at the 2020 Summer Olympics
Olympic basketball players of South Korea